U.S. Route 24 (US 24) is one of the original United States highways of 1926. It originally ran from Pontiac, Michigan, in the east to Kansas City, Missouri, in the west.  Today, the highway's eastern terminus is in Independence Township, Michigan at an intersection with I-75, and its western terminus is near Minturn, Colorado at an intersection with I-70.  The highway transitions from north–south to east–west signage at the Ohio-Michigan state line.

Route description

Colorado 

In Colorado, US 24 begins at the interchange of I-70 and US 6 (Exit 171) near Minturn. From this interchange, US 24 proceeds southeast through Minturn and continues south to the Continental Divide at Tennessee Pass. It continues south to Johnson Village and then joins with US 285 northbound to the Trout Creek Pass. After the pass, US 24 separates from US 285 and continues east to Colorado Springs and then northeast to Limon, where US 24 joins I-70 for most of the rest of its routing to the Kansas state line.

When the United States Highway System was started in 1926, US 24 in Colorado was designated US 40S. It began in Grand Junction and went east along the current I-70 corridor to Minturn, from which it follows the current route to Limon. From Limon east to the Kansas border, the current US 24 was designated US 40N. US 40S west of Limon and US 40N east of Limon received the US 24 designation in 1936, when US 24 was extended west from Kansas City, Missouri. The segment between Grand Junction and Minturn was decommissioned in 1975.

Kansas 

US 24 does not meet I-70 again until Kansas City. On December 1, 2008, US 24 was rerouted southward on US 73 to I-70 west of Kansas City, continuing east on I-70 on the final  in Kansas. US 24 serves Manhattan, as well as the northern sides of  Topeka and Lawrence.

The original designation for the current US 24 route in Kansas was US 40N. It went from the Colorado border to Manhattan. In 1936, US 24 received its current designation after an extension west from Kansas City.

In Kansas, US 24 is merged with US 59 from Williamstown to a place in North Lawrence called Teepee Junction. From there it is merged with US 40 until Kansas City.

Missouri 
In Missouri, US 24 serves Kansas City, Independence, Buckner, Lexington, Waverly, Carrollton, Keytesville, Moberly, Madison, Monroe City, Palmyra and West Quincy.  It runs concurrently with US 65 between Waverly and Carrollton, passing over the Missouri River via the Waverly Bridge when concurrent.  After becoming a two-lane road, it is then concurrent with Route 5 in Keytesville (where it is called Jackson Street), and then passes by the city of Huntsville before turning into a four-lane highway and crossing US 63 at Moberly. It is finally concurrent (for the third time) with US 36 east of Monroe City and with US 61 from south of Palmyra to West Quincy. The segment shared with US 61 is part of the Avenue of the Saints.

Along the route within Independence is the Harry S. Truman Presidential Library and Museum.

Illinois 

Crossing into Illinois, US 24 uses the pairing of the cable-stayed Quincy Bayview Bridge (westbound) and the older Quincy Memorial Bridge (eastbound) over the Mississippi River in Quincy. , it is the main arterial highway from Quincy northeast to Peoria. Between these two cities, the highway follows the old Peoria to Quincy stage coach route. US 24 travels onto the Shade–Lohmann Bridge on I-474 to bypass Peoria, and it gets off at exit 9.

In East Peoria, US 24 forms a wrong-way concurrency with IL 116 and US 150 as it parallels the Illinois River. From East Peoria, US 24 runs directly east (parallel to Toledo, Peoria and Western Railway) through a number of small towns en route to Indiana. US 24 crosses into Indiana at the state line east of Sheldon.

Indiana 

In Indiana, US 24 runs east from the Illinois state line to Huntington. At Huntington, US 24 turns northeast and runs to Fort Wayne; it then overlaps I-69 and I-469 to bypass the city before entering Ohio at the state line east of Fort Wayne. The segment of US 24 between Logansport and Toledo, Ohio is part of the Hoosier Heartland Industrial Corridor project of the Intermodal Surface Transportation Efficiency Act.

Ohio 

From Fort Wayne, US 24 follows the path of the Maumee River towards Toledo. In Ohio, the roadway enters the state east of Woodburn, Indiana, near Antwerp. Between the Indiana state line and Toledo, this portion of the roadway is known as the Fort to Port segment of the Hoosier Heartland Industrial Corridor.

Between Napoleon and Toledo, modern US 24 lies north of the Maumee River as a highway built to Interstate Highway standards. Just north of Waterville is the site of the Battle of Fallen Timbers of 1794. General Anthony Wayne after, constructing a trail from Fort Wayne to (Fort) Defiance, fought and defeated a Native American consortium, thus opening northern Ohio to white settlement. At a point on the Toledo's north side US 24 veers from northeast–southwest to true north–south, turning on to Telegraph Road, while Detroit Avenue continues as a city street that connects to M-125 (Dixie Highway) at the Michigan border.

The path through Toledo of US 24 follows the course of old US 25, old US 25 being farther away from the course of north–south I-75. Partially truncated as a state route, what had been US 24 was renumbered as Ohio State Route 25 where it remained a state highway, and US 25 in greater Toledo became US 24.

Michigan 

In Michigan, US 24 enters from Toledo, Ohio and serves the city of Monroe and the Detroit Metro Area, where it is known as Telegraph Road. It continues north through the western edge of Detroit. It passes through Michigan's "mixing bowl", which is where I-696 (Walter P. Reuther Freeway), M-10 (John C. Lodge Freeway/Northwestern Highway), and Lahser Road intersect. US 24 continues north along Telegraph Road as the border between Waterford and Pontiac until its intersection with Dixie Highway where it travels to the northwest until its termination at I-75 in Independence Township, Michigan.

History 
Between Dixie Highway in Pontiac, Michigan, and Laskey Road in Toledo, Ohio, the highway is known as Telegraph Road, named before the highway system existed after the telegraph wires to which it once ran parallel. Mark Knopfler of the rock band Dire Straits wrote the song "Telegraph Road" about the development and decay of the road, which he spotted en route to a concert. It is a major surface route through western areas of Metro Detroit. 

US 24 (Telegraph Road) along the west edge of Detroit, Michigan was one of the first roads where Michigan left turns were implemented. This pattern was introduced at the time of, or soon after, its widening to a six- to eight-lane divided highway between 1960 and 1963. Several other channelization techniques are also used; for instance, the M-153 (Ford Road) intersection includes a southbound jughandle and a cutoff for northbound left-turning traffic.

US 24 from Minturn, Colorado to Limon, Colorado is a former route of US 40S. Between Limon and Manhattan, Kansas, US 24 follows the old route of US 40N.

US 24 followed State Avenue in Kansas City, Kansas until December 1, 2008, when it was rerouted onto K-7 and I-70.

As Michigan enacted alcohol prohibition earlier than Ohio, for a time this road was notorious for its use by bootleggers, bringing booze from Cincinnati and Cleveland into Detroit.

From 2008 to 2012, US 24 from Fort Wayne to Toledo was mostly expanded to Interstate Standards as part of an overall "Fort to Port" project, in reference to Fort Wayne and the port of Toledo.

As of 2018, US 24 has been moved to follow I-435 south and I-70 west in Kansas City, Missouri; the original US 24 that used to follow Independence Avenue is now a business route of US 24.

Major intersections 
Colorado
  northwest of Minturn
  in Johnson Village. The highways travel concurrently to Antero Junction.
  in Colorado Springs. The highways travel concurrently through the city.
  in Limon. The highways travel concurrently to east of Limon.
  in Limon
  east of Limon. The highways travel concurrently to Seibert.
  in Burlington. The highways travel concurrently through the city.
  in Burlington. The highways travel concurrently to south-southwest of Levant, Kansas.
Kansas
  south-southeast of Gem
  in Hill City
  in Stockton
  in Osborne. The highways travel concurrently to south of Portis.
  east of Glasco
  in Riley. The highways travel concurrently to east of Riley.
  in Topeka
  in Williamstown. The highways travel concurrently to Lawrence.
  in Lawrence. US 24/US 40 travel concurrently to Kansas City, Missouri.
  on the Kansas City–Bonner Springs city line. The highways travel concurrently into Bonner Springs proper.
  in Bonner Springs. I-70/US 24 travel concurrently to Kansas City, Missouri.
  on the Kansas City–Edwardsville city line
  in Kansas City
  in Kansas City. The highways travel concurrently through the city.
  in Kansas City
  in Kansas City. US 24/US 169 travel concurrently to Kansas City, Missouri.
Missouri
  in Kansas City. The highways travel concurrently through the city.
  in Kansas City
  in Kansas City
  east of Waverly. The highways travel concurrently to Carrollton.
  in Moberly
  in Monroe City. The highways travel concurrently to northeast of Rensselaer.
  south of Palmyra. The highways travel concurrently to Taylor.
Illinois
  south of Bloomfield
  in Rushville
  northeast of Beaty. The highways travel concurrently to Duncan Mills.
  on the Peoria–Bartonville line. I-474/US 24 travel concurrently to Creve Coeur.
  in East Peoria. The highways travel concurrently through the city.
  in East Peoria
  in El Paso
  in Chenoa
  in Gilman
  in Gilman. The highways travel concurrently through the city.
  in Sheldon. The highways travel concurrently to Kentland, Indiana.
Indiana
  in Kentland
  in Remington. The highways travel concurrently to Wolcott.
  east of Remington
  in Reynolds. The highways travel concurrently to Monticello.
  west of Logansport. The highways travel concurrently to southeast of Logansport.
  in Peru Township
  in Huntington
  in Fort Wayne. The highways travel concurrently through the city.
  in Fort Wayne. US 24/US 30 travel concurrently to east of New Haven.
  in Fort Wayne
  in Fort Wayne. I-469/US 24 travel concurrently to east of New Haven.
Ohio
  in Emerald Township
  in Napoleon Township. The highways travel concurrently to Liberty Township.
  in Maumee
  in Maumee.
  in Toledo
Michigan
  in Ash Township
  in Taylor
  in Dearborn
  in Redford Charter Township
  in Southfield
  in Springfield Township

See also 

U.S. Route 124
U.S. Route 224
Business U.S. Route 24 - Manitou Springs, Colorado
Business U.S. Route 24 - Goodland, Kansas
Alternate U.S. Route 24 from Toledo to Detroit

References

External links 

}
Endpoints of U.S. Highway 24
Fort to Port: First Person
Maumee Valley Heritage Corridor
Michigan US-24 endpoint photos
Illinois Highway Ends: US-24
Indiana Highway Ends: US-24
Info on Ohio re-alignment of US-24 from ODOT
Live webcam view of US Hwy 24 from Woodland Park, Colorado
US24 Fort to Port Project

 
Interstate 70
24
024
Ronald Reagan Trail
24